The Copa Colsanitas is a women's professional tennis tournament held in Bogotá, Colombia at the Centro de Alto Rendimiento. Held since 1998, this WTA 250 tournament is played on outdoor clay courts.

Past finals

Singles

Doubles

Records

* = Champion

Championships by country

References

External links
Official website

 
Tennis tournaments in Colombia
Clay court tennis tournaments
WTA Tour
Recurring sporting events established in 1998